Balaoan, officially the Municipality of Balaoan, is a 1st class municipality in the province of La Union, Philippines. According to the 2020 census, it has a population of 40,339.

Geography
Balaoan is situated north of Bacnotan, south of Bangar, east of Luna and west of Santol. Barangay Paraoir is Balaoan's pristine coastal community on the South China Sea.

Balaoan can be reached from Manila using the MacArthur Highway, or by airplane via Canaoay Airport in San Fernando City.

Its land area of  consists mostly of agricultural lands. It occupies 4.3% of the total area of the province.

Climate

Barangays
Balaoan is politically subdivided into 36 barangays. These barangays are headed by elected officials: Barangay Captain, Barangay Council, whose members are called Barangay Councilors. All are elected every three years.

 Almeida
 Antonino
 Apatut
 Ar-arampang
 Baracbac Este
 Baracbac Oeste
 Bet-ang
 Bulbulala
 Bungol
 Butubut Este
 Butubut Norte
 Butubut Oeste
 Butubut Sur
 Cabuaan
 Calliat
 Calungbuyan
 Camiling
 Dr. Camilo Osias
 Guinaburan
 Masupe
 Nagsabaran Norte
 Nagsabaran Sur
 Nalasin
 Napaset
 Pa-o
 Pagbennecan
 Pagleddegan
 Pantar Norte
 Pantar Sur
 Paraoir
 Patpata
 Sablut
 San Pablo
 Sinapangan Norte
 Sinapangan Sur
 Tallipugo

Etymology of Barangay names
 Dr. Camilo Osias - name of a former senator who was born in Balaoan 
 Nagsabaran (as Nagsabaran Norte & Nagsabar Sur)  – This name (meaning "place where [the road] branches out") was given to the place because the national road branched out to this barrio. The root word is sabar, meaning "to branch out".
Pantar (as Pantar Norte & Pantar Sur) - Ilocano term of "lively".

History 
According to William Scott, "Balaoan itself was an emporium for the exchange of Igorot gold."

Balaoan, formerly "Puraw" (meaning "white') was originally part of Ilocos Sur. The town's present name originated during the Spanish colonial era. A group of Spanish soldiers were on patrol and went on to rest on a sitio. The villagers were curious about the soldiers because of their unusual descent and fair skin color (others have olive skin, which is still lighter than the skin tone of villagers). They flocked the soldiers touching their guns, too afraid that the guns might explode accidentally, one villager asked the soldier in a local vernacular.. "Aoan bala?" ("Awan bala?" in modern spelling, meaning "No bullets?"). The soldier did not understand what the villager meant, he uttered the last word first, and remembering the last, he said "Bala-aoan", which is pronounced on its modern town name "Balaoan".

During the Spanish colonization of the Philippines, a secret society of insurrectos was organized in the municipality. Its purpose was to fight and revolt against the Spanish Government in the area. On the eve of the revolution, a traitor told the Spanish of their plan. The Spanish soldiers, without any investigation, arrested seven members of the secret society and executed them the same night. Only one, Fernando Ostrea, escaped with leg wounds. He informed the people about what had happened. In memory of the seven Martyrs, a masonic lodge, Siete Martires Lodge No. 177, was organized.

Balaoan is one of the oldest municipalities in La Union, having been founded in 1704. Its first Capitan is Ignacio Duldulao.

Demographics

The dominant language spoken in Balaoan is Ilocano.

Economy

Festivities
The church of Balaoan is under the advocacy of the town's patron saint, St. Nicholas of Tolentino, whose feast day is celebrated on September. Balaoan's town fiesta is celebrated every December 21 to 23 of the year.

Government
Balaoan, belonging to the first congressional district of the province of La Union, is governed by a mayor designated as its local chief executive and by a municipal council as its legislative body in accordance with the Local Government Code. The mayor, vice mayor, and the councilors are elected directly by the people through an election which is being held every three years.

Elected officials

Education

Elementary schools

 Almeida Elementary School
 Apatut Elementary School (Apatut)
 Ar-arampang Elementary School (Ar- Arampang,Balaoan)
 Balaoan Central Elementary School (Antonino and Cabua-an)
 Balaoan Christian Foundation (Nalasin)
 Bulbulala Elementary School (Bulbulala)
 Bungol Elementary School (Bungol)
 Butubut Elementary School (Butubut Sur)
 Butubut Norte Elementary School (Butubut Norte)
 Calliat Elementary School (Calliat)
 Guinaburan Elementary School (Guinaburan)
 Masupe Elementary School (Masupe)
 Nagsabaran Sur Elementary School (Nsgsabaran Sur)
 Osias Educational Foundation (Dr. Camilo Osias)
 Pantar Community School (Pantar Norte)
 Pantar Sur Elementary School (Pantar Sur)
 Paraoir Elementary School (Paraoir)
 Patpata Elementary School (Patpata)
 San Nicolas Academy
 San Nicolas Academy (Dr. Camilo Osias, Nalasin and Antonino)
 Sinapangan National High School (Sinapangan Norte)
 Sinapangan Norte Elementary School (Sinapangan Norte)
 Sinapangan Sur Elementary School (Sinapangan Sur)

High schools
 Bungol National High School (Bungol)
 Butubut National High School (Butubut Norte)
 Castor Z. Concepcion Memorial National High School (Nalasin and Antonino)
 Don Mariano Marcos Memorial State University National High School (Paraoir)
 Osias Educational Foundation (Dr. Camilo Osias)
 San Nicolas Academy

Notable personalities
Camilo Osías, former Senator
Magnolia Antonino, former Senator

Gallery

References

External links

 [ Philippine Standard Geographic Code]
 Philippine Census Information
 Local Governance Performance Management System

Municipalities of La Union
Populated places established in 1704
1704 establishments in the Spanish Empire